St. Patrick's Church at Clonevan (also spelt Clonevin) is in the Church of Ireland parish of Ardamine, County Wexford in the Diocese of Cashel and Ossory. The church is located on the R742 road south of the village of Ballygarrett near Cahore Point on the Wexford coast.

Cahore House at  Clonlevan, which is presently unoccupied, was the home of the George family for several generations. It was built in the 1840s by John George, Solicitor General for Ireland, who had inherited land there from his father.

Transport
Bus Éireann local route 379 serves Clonevan on Mondays and Saturdays only. On Mondays there is a bus at 11:08am to Gorey and at 4:02pm to Wexford. On Saturdays there is a bus to Gorey at 9:08am and to Wexford at 12:36pm.

References

External links
 Church of Ireland website

Religious buildings and structures in County Wexford
Church of Ireland church buildings in the Republic of Ireland